Clase 406 (English title: Class 406) is a Mexican telenovela produced by Pedro Damián for Televisa, broadcast by Canal de las Estrellas (now known simply as Las Estrellas). It is a remake of the Colombian telenovela Francisco, El Matemático (1999). Clase 406 originally aired from Monday, July 1, 2002, to Friday, October 31, 2003. The story deals with the problems of newer Latino youth, in general like sex, drug dealing, abuse, drinking, rape, deception, and heartbreak.

Jorge Poza, Irán Castillo, Anahí, Sherlyn, Dulce María, Sara Maldonado, Christian Chávez, Alfonso Herrera, and Aarón Díaz starred as protagonists, while Julio Camejo, Tony Dalton, Miguel Rodarte, and Francesca Guillén starred as antagonists.

Plot
Francisco Romero is a small-town teacher who decides to try his luck in Mexico City. He joins the faculty of Prep school number 10 "Rosario Castellanos" and soon realizes that his work is more demanding than he expected; in addition to having to prove himself as a teacher, he must prove himself as a human being.

He will find that, in order to make a difference with his students, he will also have to assume the roles of counselor, psychologist, doctor, and even detective. The themes this story deals with are: dropping out of school, teen pregnancy, street gangs, men who abuse their stepdaughters, teenagers forced to work to support their families, and alcoholic parents who lead their children down the same path - that is, problems of a very real nature, experienced by high school students the world over.

This is also a love story. Both students and faculty fall victim to Cupid's random arrows, beginning with Francisco and Adriana (the school counselor) who, nonetheless, must put their hormones on hold long enough to become respected role models in the eyes of their students. But their love story is not destined for a happy ending, since Adriana will have to choose between Francisco and her love for her son.

Francisco will have a second chance at love with Ana Maria, the new English teacher who will become his right arm when dealing with his students and their problems in and out of school. Ultimately, however, he will find true love in the arms of Angela, the woman in charge of the school cafeteria. She is a working mother whose teenage children Juan David and Sandra attend this same school, and who has managed to keep a fine balance between being a housewife, a working woman, a mother and a lover.

The school itself occupies center stage in this story, and will become the forum where the main conflicts of the plot will be exposed and resolved, and where Francisco Romero, in his role as teacher, will not only show his students how entertaining learning can be, but will make them understand the importance of respect for authority, of friendship, camaraderie, love, and the values that will guide their conduct as they close the cycle of adolescence and move on to become adults.

One of the recurring themes in this telenovela is friendship, which is best exemplified by the story of Gabriela and Marcela, two high school students who struggle to get ahead and maintain their friendship alive in spite of the painful experiences they go through and the many obstacles that threaten to drive them apart. Their friendship will be put to the test when one of them realizes that everyone will give you advice, but no one will stand with you to face the consequences.

Alcohol abuse among teenagers, sexual responsibility, domestic violence and prostitution are also topics addressed in this production. More problems are Magdalena, a strikingly beautiful young woman with a rebellious nature. She faces domestic abuse, while another student Hugo, gets involved with gangs leading to his death. Carlos get swindled into drug dealing and addiction after his friend's death, Kike deals with heartbreak which leads to him becoming an alcoholic, Freddy who deals with being gay, and Daniela whose dreams of becoming a model almost lead her to the end of her life.

While Tatiana comes as the teen who feels out of place as a rich kid whose family has gone poor and must adapt to face the gang 406. She ultimately leads to drugs much later on. The toughest struggle is when Francisco, their professor who has stuck through thick and thin with them must leave with his new wife.

A new professor, Santiago, takes his place. Can the students accept him? Will he be able to fill the void that was left by his predecessor? His troubled past including a young girl who was sexually harassing him in an old school he taught and when he does not agree to have a relationship with her she accuses him of rape.

The girl with the troubled mind is known as Jessica. Her story is one of the classics, a poor rich girl who wishes to act like a villain due to a father who doesn't pay attention to her, and a dead mother who she strives for.

Cast

Main 
 Jorge Poza as Professor Francisco Romero "El Matemático" 
 Francisco Gattorno as Santiago Cadavid / Luis Felipe Villasana
 Alejandra Barros as Adriana Pineda Suárez / Ángela Pineda Suárez
 Michelle Vieth as Nadia Castillo Bojorquez "La Profe de Gimnasia"
 Irán Castillo as Magdalena "Magdis" Rivera "La Rebelde"
 Anahí as Jessica Riquelme Drech "La Loca"
 Sherlyn González as Gabriela "Gaby" Chávez Rey "La Virgen"
 Dulce María as Marcela "Marce" Mejía "La Otra Virgen"
 Sara Maldonado as Tatiana del Moral "La Riquilla Pobre"
 Christian Chávez as Fernando "Fercho" Lucena "El Chino"
 Francisco Rubio as Carlos Muñoz "El Caballo"
 Aarón Díaz as Enrique "Kike" González "El Guapo"
 Grettell Valdéz as Daniela "Danny" Jiménez Robles "El Cuerpo de la clase"
 Alfonso Herrera as Juan David "Juancho" Rodríguez Pineda "El Ligador"
 Frantz Cossio as Alfredo "Fredy" Ordoñez "El Consentido"
 Pablo Magallanes as Hugo Salcedo "El Chavo Banda"
 Karla Cossío as Sandra Paola Rodríguez Pineda "La Hermana"
 Luis Fernando Peña as Mario Fernández "El Gato"

Also starring 
 Sebastián Rulli as Juan Esteban San Pedro "El Psicólogo"
 Alexa Damián as Ana María Londoño "La Teacher"
 Arap Bethke as Antonio "Chacho" Mendoza Cuervo
 Tony Dalton as Dagoberto "Dago" García "El violador"
 Julio Camejo as Douglas Cifuentes
 Fabián Robles as Giovanni Ferrer Escudero
 Miguel Rodarte as Leonardo "Leo" Nava
 Francesca Guillén as Samsara / Paloma
 Rafael Inclán as Don Ezequiel Cuervo Domínguez "El Director"
 Beatriz Moreno as Blanca Inés "Blanquita" Beteta "La Secretaria"

Recurring 
 Maria Fernanda Garcia as Marlen Rivera
 Felipe Nájera as Dionisio Nino Infante
 Jose Elias Moreno as Manuel del Moral
 Lucero Lander as Dora del Moral
 David Galindo as José Manuel del Moral
 Aracely Mali as Clara Betancourt
 Armando Hernández as Cipriano Goytisolo "El Alebrije"
 Manuel Landeta as Gonzalo Acero
 Imanol Landeta as Alejandro "Alex" Acero Pineda "El Ñiño"
 Luis Fernando Ceballos as Valentino
 Karen Juantorena as Vanessa
 Alan Gutiérrez as Pablo
 Felipe Sánchez as Chuli Nava
 Gabriela Platas as Elisa Camargos
 Liuba de Lasse as Cindy "La DJ"
 Rosangela Balbo as Bertha Ponce
 Eleazar Gómez as Brian Rios
 Wendy González as Blanca Uribe Soto
 José Luis Reséndez as Teacher Gilberto Bernal
 Juan Carlos Colombo as Don Jorge Riquelme
 Alejandra Jurado as Matilde Rodríguez
 Susan Vohn as Silvia
 Giovan D'Angelo as Federico "Fede" Barbera
 Catherine Papile as Andrea
 Conrado Osorio as Edgar
 Carolina Rincón as Susy
 Karla Luengas as Pilar "Pili" Reyna
 Roberto Assad as Dylan "El DJ"
 Bobby Larios as César
 Yessica Salazar as Brenda
 Lourdes Canale as Doña Guillermina "Guille" Muñoz
 Héctor Gómez as Dr. Narváez
 Juan Peláez as Octavio Valenzuela
 Alma Cero as Bianca
 Queta Lavat as Cuquita
 Jose Luis Cordero "Pocholo" as Sr Lucena "Papa de Fercho"
 Dolores Salomon "Bodokito" as Barbara de Lucena
 Adriana Laffan as Teresa Salcedo
 Agustín Arana as Ramiro
 Adriana Barraza as Mabel
 Arturo García Tenorio as Rodolfo
 Alicia Farh as Dolores
 René Casados as Manolo
 Aitor Iturrioz as Max Brouer
 Jorge de Silva as Luigi Ferrer
 Polly as Emiliana Askenazy
 Gabriela Bermúdez as Miriam
 Xóchitl Vigil as Consuelo
 Payín Cejudo as Olga Limonqui
 Paola Flores as Doña Cleotilde
 Aída Diaz as Mercedes
 Esther Diez as Cecilia
 Adrian Mass as Marco
 Pablo Poumian as Rosendo
 Ariadne Pellicer as Esther Peñaloza
 Juan Antonio Edwards as Jerónimo
 Francisco Avendaño as Don Humberto
 Marieth Rodríguez as Valeria Villasana
 Gabriela Cano as Aurora
 Verónica Ibrra as Angelica
 Samantha López as Alejandra Barbosa
 Raquel Morell as Yolanda Bojórquez
 Humberto Dupeyrón as Rubén
 Julio Vega as Dr. Huerta
 Eduardo de la Peña as Gumaro
 Juan Carlos Nava as Pedro Salcedo
 Benjamín Islas as Raul Jimenez
 Andres Montiel as Eleazar Espinoza
 Alberto Salaberri as Erick
 Miguel Priego as Jorge Jiménez
 Miguel Loyo as Mauricio Pereira
 Alejandro Ciangherotti as Lic. Israel Antunez
 Alizair Gómez as Mario Sanpedro
 Azul Guaita as Juanita
 Claudio Rojo as Pablo Benedetti
 Dobrina Cristeva as Natalia
 Jacqueline Voltaire as Teacher Fabianne
 Liza Willert as Catalina Rodriguez
 Mariagna Prats as Silvia
 Marisol del Olmo as Eugenia Moretti
 Martha Julia as Angela
 Rosángela Balbó as Bertha
 Roxana Saucedo as Mariana
 Thelma Dorantes as Carmela
 Yatana as Gina de Franco

Music

Clase 406 

Clase 406 is the debut soundtrack of the telenovela, and was released on February 18, 2003.

Clase 406 El Siguiente Paso... ! 

Clase 406 El Siguiente Paso... ! is the second and final soundtrack of the telenovela, and was released on August 30, 2003.

Awards

References

External links

 at esmas.com 

2002 telenovelas
Mexican telenovelas
2002 Mexican television series debuts
2002 Mexican television series endings
Television shows set in Mexico City
Televisa telenovelas
Children's telenovelas
Teen telenovelas
Mexican television series based on Colombian television series
Spanish-language telenovelas
Television series about educators